Kirtys MacKenzie (born 17 October 1993) is an English footballer who last played for Dunmow Town.

Career
MacKenzie graduated from the Torquay United youth academy, and came into the first team picture at the start of the 2012–13 season, after a suspension to Aaron Downes exposed the "Gulls" lack of established centre-halves. He made his debut on 1 September 2012, in a 1–1 draw with Port Vale at Vale Park. Manager Martin Ling said that he had an "outstanding game". In March 2013, he joined Taunton Town on loan until the end of the season.

After his release from Torquay United in January 2014, MacKenzie joined Conference South team Chelmsford City in September 2014. However, MacKenzie did not make an appearance for Chelmsford City in his time at the club. MacKenzie signed for Frome Town during the 2015–16 season, before leaving the club in October 2015 after manager Nick Bunyard expressed concerns about MacKenzie's commute to Somerset from his home in London.

During the 2020–21 season, MacKenzie signed for newly formed Essex and Suffolk Border League club Dunmow Town. MacKenzie made eight appearances, scoring twice, in all competitions for the club during the season.

Statistics

References

External links

Profile at the official Torquay United website

1993 births
Living people
English footballers
Association football defenders
Torquay United F.C. players
Taunton Town F.C. players
English Football League players
Gloucester City A.F.C. players
Chelmsford City F.C. players
Frome Town F.C. players